Spitak Football Club, is a defunct Armenian football club from the town of Spitak, Lori Province.  The club was dissolved in 1999.

League record

External links

FC Spitak
Spitak
1999 disestablishments in Armenia